Alois Dvořáček (January 26, 1909 – ?) was a Czech basketball player who competed for Czechoslovakia in the 1936 Summer Olympics.

In 1936 he was a member of the Czechoslovak basketball team, which was eliminated in the third round of the Olympic tournament. He played one match.

References

External links
 
 
 
 part 7 the basketball tournament  (archived)

1909 births
Year of death missing
Czechoslovak men's basketball players
Czech men's basketball players
Olympic basketball players of Czechoslovakia
Basketball players at the 1936 Summer Olympics